Montessori School was a flag stop on the Reading Company's New Hope Branch. The line on which the station served is now New Hope and Ivyland Railroad. This station no longer stands.

References

Former Reading Company stations
Former railway stations in Bucks County, Pennsylvania
Railway stations in the United States opened in 1891
Railway stations closed in 1952
1891 establishments in Pennsylvania
1952 disestablishments in Pennsylvania